Dieter Eduardo Vargas Guzmán (born 27 May 1993) is a Mexican professional footballer who plays as a centre-back for Salvadoran club Chalatenango.

References

External links
 

Living people
1993 births
Association football midfielders
Tigres UANL footballers
Atlético San Luis footballers
Tampico Madero F.C. footballers
Alebrijes de Oaxaca players
Potros UAEM footballers
Saltillo F.C. footballers
Ascenso MX players
Liga Premier de México players
Tercera División de México players
Footballers from San Luis Potosí
People from San Luis Potosí City
Mexican footballers